Christopher Paul Stuart-Bennett (born 1952) is a British lightweight rower.

Rowing career
He was part of the lightweight coxless four at the 1976 World Rowing Championships in Villach, Austria which finished 5th in the B final. He won a gold medal at the 1977 World Rowing Championships in Amsterdam with the lightweight men's eight.

He won the 1973 Stewards' Challenge Cup and the 1977 Thames Challenge Cup at the Henley Royal Regatta.

Personal life
He was a doctor of dentistry by trade.

References

1952 births
British male rowers
World Rowing Championships medalists for Great Britain
Living people